"Abbronzatissima" (Italian for "Very tanned") is a song composed by Edoardo Vianello and Carlo Rossi, and performed by Vianello. The single, considered an instant classic in Italy, peaked for two weeks at the first place of the Italian hit parade and sold over 6.5 million copies.

In 1963 Cleto Colombo and The A. Novaris also record the piece (Nuova Enigmistica Tascabile, N. 455).

Track listing
7" single –  PM45-3200 
 "Abbronzatissima" (Edoardo Vianello, Carlo Rossi) –    2:29
 "Il cicerone" (Edoardo Vianello, Carlo Rossi) –  	   2:28

References

 

1963 singles
Italian songs
Number-one singles in Italy
1963 songs